Massarosa is a city and comune in the province of Lucca, Tuscany, Italy.  The city is near Lucca and Pisa. 

The city hosts Massarosa International Piano Competition.

Sister cities
Massarosa is twinned with:
  Gmina Łużna, Poland
  Teià, Spain

See also
Lake Massaciuccoli

References

Cities and towns in Tuscany